The Martin Formation is a geologic formation in Arizona. It preserves fossils dating back to the Devonian period.

See also

 List of fossiliferous stratigraphic units in Arizona
 Paleontology in Arizona

References
 

Devonian Arizona
Devonian southern paleotemperate deposits